Abdullapur is a village in Ranga Reddy district in Telangana, India. It falls under Hayathnagar mandal. It is 5 kilometers from the Outer Ring Road, Hyderabad. The world famous Ramoji Film City is in Abdullahpurmet. Abdullapurmet is a developing residential locality on the outskirts of Hyderabad. It is located alongside Hyderabad-Suryapet Highway (NH-65). It has a population of about 5511. The male and female populations are 2822 and 2689 respectively. The size of the area is about 3.98 square kilometer.

References

Villages in Ranga Reddy district